Aparecido Francisco de Lima  (born November 2, 1981), or simply  Lima , is a striker player from Brazil. He currently plays for ASA.

Lima previously played in the Campeonato Brasileiro for Coritiba, Cruzeiro, Atlético Paranaense, São Paulo, Botafogo and Figueirense. He also had a brief stint in Portugal with Braga.

References

1981 births
Living people
Brazilian footballers
Sport Club Corinthians Paulista players
Coritiba Foot Ball Club players
Cruzeiro Esporte Clube players
S.C. Braga players
Club Athletico Paranaense players
Ittihad FC players
Al Nassr FC players
São Paulo FC players
Botafogo de Futebol e Regatas players
Al-Shamal SC players
Ceará Sporting Club players
ABC Futebol Clube players
Agremiação Sportiva Arapiraquense players
Brazilian expatriate footballers
Expatriate footballers in Portugal
Expatriate footballers in Saudi Arabia
Expatriate footballers in Qatar
Expatriate footballers in Mexico
Association football forwards